Fumiyo Yamashita-Kaizu (born 1 April 1967) is a Japanese table tennis player. She competed at the 1992 Summer Olympics and the 1996 Summer Olympics.

References

1967 births
Living people
Japanese female table tennis players
Olympic table tennis players of Japan
Table tennis players at the 1992 Summer Olympics
Table tennis players at the 1996 Summer Olympics
Place of birth missing (living people)